The 2016–17 Cayman Islands Premier League season is the 38th season of top-tier football in the Cayman Islands. It began on 2 October 2016. Scholars International were the defending champions, having won their 10th title last season.

Clubs 

George Town SC finished 8th at the conclusion of last season and were relegated. Taking their place in this season is Latinos FC.

Sunset FC finished 7th at the conclusion of last season and had to participate in a play-off against North Side SC, which Sunset won 3–0. Therefore, they remain in the Premier League for this season.

Table

Promotion/relegation playoff
The 7th place team in this competition, Sunset, will face the runners-up of the First Division,
Cayman Brac, for a place in next season's competition.

Sunset retained their place in the competition.

Results

Regular Home Games

Additional Home Games

References 

Cayman Islands Premier League seasons
Cayman Islands
Prem